Haji Faiz Mohammed is an elderly Afghani man who was held and interrogated by the United States military in the Guantanamo Bay detention camps, in Cuba. Mohammed spent about eight months in Guantanamo and was repatriated on October 28, 2002.

Detention in Guantanamo

Mohammed was flown to the U.S. military detention camp in Guantanamo in 2002 after being swept up in a raid by troops in Afghanistan. An assessment written by the Joint Task Force Guantanamo says. "There is no reason on the record for detainee being transferred to Guantánamo Bay detention facility," 

Faiz was released in October 2002 after being held for eight months, and was put in the Medical Scientific Academy Hospital in Kabul.

Mohammed's age
Mohammed, who American intelligence analysts estimate was approximately 72 years old at the time, said the Americans had initially seized him during a hospital visit in Uruzgan.
He says he was blindfolded and bound, then flown to Kandahar in a helicopter.

Reports suggest that he bordered on senile and initially claimed that he was over a hundred years old. The New York Times said that he was "babbling at times like a child...struggled to complete sentences and strained to hear words that were shouted at him.

See also 
 Mohammed Sadiq elderly prisoner held at Guantanamo
 Nasrat Khan elderly prisoner held at Guantanamo

References

External links
The oldest of the old: First 'hardcore' suspects freed from Camp Delta.. three Afghans, combined age 196, The Daily Mirror, October 30, 2002
Guantánamo detainee file: Haji Faiz Mohammed US9AF-000657DP

Guantanamo detainees known to have been released
Living people
Pashtun people
1932 births